Xindian is a town in Xiang'an District, Xiamen, Fujian, China.

History

In the lead up to the Battle of Kuningtou in 1949, PLA forces massed at Aotou (Ao-t'ou), Dadeng (Tateng) and Lianhe (Lienho) (then part of Nan'an County).

In the Second Taiwan Strait Crisis in 1958, Lianhe was one of the areas from which PLA forces shelled Kinmen County, Republic of China (Taiwan).

In 1959, Xindian Commune was established.

In January 1971, Dadeng, Xiaodeng and Liuhe were transferred from Nan'an to Tong'an County.

In 1984, Xindian Commune became Xindian Township.

In 1987, Xindian Township became Xindian Town.

Geography
The island of Eyu Yu (O-yü Hsü,  'alligator islet') is located to the west of Xindian.

Administrative divisions
Xindian administers forty-one residential communities: Xinxing, Xindian, Lianhe (Lien-ho, Lienho), Xiawu (Hsia-wu), Xiaolong (Hsiao-lung), Hengcuo (Heng-ts'o), Maolin, Dazhai, Lütang (Lü-tang), Xiwei, Xiangwu, Hutou, Dongkeng, Hongqian, Hongcuo, Luqian (Lu-ch'ien), Xiahoubin, Liuwudian (Liu-wu-tien, Liuwutien), Puyuan (P'u-yüan), Xibin, Aotou (Ao-t'ou), Oucuo (Ou-ts'o), Pengcuo (P'eng-ts'o), Qianwu (Ch'ien-wu), Houcun, Caicuo (Ts'ai-ts'o), Chentang, Dongyuan (Tung-yüan), Shamei, Xiaxu, Anshan, Dongjie, Zhongzhai, Pubian (P'u-pien), Guluo, Puxi, Dongxing, Honglinhu, Zengban, Xiangmei, Guyan

See also 
 List of township-level divisions of Fujian

References

Subdistricts of the People's Republic of China
Township-level divisions of Fujian
Geography of Xiamen